Kyung-tae is a Korean masculine given name. Its meaning differs based on the hanja used to write each syllable of the name. There are 54 hanja with the reading "kyung" and 20 hanja with the reading "tae" on the South Korean government's official list of hanja which may be registered for use in given names.

People with this name include:
Han Kyung-tai (born 1975), South Korean handball player
Kim Kyung-tae (born 1986), South Korean golfer  
No Kyung-tae (born 1986), South Korean football player
Hwang Kyung-tae (born 1996), South Korean baseball pitcher
Kim Kyeong-tae, South Korean judo practitioner, represented South Korea at the 2014 World Judo Championships – Men's 100 kg

Fictional characters with this name include
Wang Gyeong-tae, in 1990 South Korean comic book Yeongsimi
Ahn Kyung-tae, in 2009 South Korean television series Two Wives

See also
List of Korean given names

References